The 2020 Gagarin Cup playoffs of the Kontinental Hockey League (KHL) began on 1 March 2020, with the top eight teams from each of the conferences, following the conclusion of the 2019–20 KHL regular season. The playoffs were scheduled to finish no later than 25 April 2020.

Due to the COVID-19 pandemic, the second round of the playoffs were initially delayed, but on 25 March 2020, the playoffs were called off.

Playoff seeds
After the regular season, the standard 16 teams qualified for the playoffs.

Western Conference
The regular season winners and Continental Cup winners were CSKA Moscow with 94 points.

Eastern Conference
Ak Bars Kazan were the Eastern Conference regular season winners with 93 points.

Playoff bracket
In each round, the highest remaining seed in each conference is matched against the lowest remaining seed. The higher-seeded team is awarded home ice advantage. In the Gagarin Cup Finals, home ice is determined based on regular season points. Each best-of-seven series follows a 2–2–1–1–1 format: the higher-seeded team plays at home for games one and two (and games five and seven, if necessary), and the lower-seeded team is at home for games three and four (and game six, if necessary).

First round

Eastern Conference first round

(1) Ak Bars Kazan vs. (8) Neftekhimik Nizhnekamsk
Ak Bars Kazan finished first in the Eastern Conference earning 93 points, winning their second Eastern Conference title in three years. Their opponents and Kharlamov Division rivals Neftekhimik Nizhnekamsk finished as the Eastern Conference's eighth seed, earning 64 points. The teams had met once previously in the playoffs with Ak Bars Kazan sweeping the first round series in 2013 – having finished as the number 1 and 8 seeds respectively in the 2012–13 season. Having played four times during the season, both teams won two games each.

(2) Barys Nur-Sultan vs. (7) Metallurg Magnitogorsk
Barys Nur-Sultan finished second in the Eastern Conference earning 84 points, winning their second consecutive Chernyshev Division title. Their opponents Metallurg Magnitogorsk finished as the Eastern Conference's seventh seed, earning 65 points. The teams had met twice previously in the playoffs with Metallurg Magnitogorsk winning both previous series – a game 7 decider in the first round in 2012, and a second round sweep in 2017. Barys Nur-Sultan won three out of the four games to be held between the teams during the 2019–20 season.

(3) Avangard Omsk vs. (6) Salavat Yulaev Ufa
Avangard Omsk finished third in the Eastern Conference earning 83 points. Their opponents and Chernyshev Division rivals Salavat Yulaev Ufa finished as the Eastern Conference's sixth seed, earning 68 points. The teams had met four times previously in the playoffs – two wins apiece – with this meeting being the third consecutive year in which the teams had met one another. Avangard Omsk won all four games to be held between the teams during the 2019–20 season.

(4) Avtomobilist Yekaterinburg vs. (5) Sibir Novosibirsk
Avtomobilist Yekaterinburg finished fourth in the Eastern Conference earning 78 points. Their opponents and Kharlamov Division rivals Sibir Novosibirsk finished as the Eastern Conference's fifth seed, earning 74 points. This was the first playoff meeting between the two teams, and Sibir Novosibirsk made the playoffs for the first time since 2016. Sibir Novosibirsk won three out of the four games to be held between the teams during the 2019–20 season, two of which came in overtime.

Western Conference first round

(1) CSKA Moscow vs. (8) Torpedo Nizhny Novgorod
CSKA Moscow finished first in the Western Conference earning 94 points, winning their second consecutive Western Conference title. Their opponents and Tarasov Division rivals Torpedo Nizhny Novgorod finished as the Western Conference's eighth seed, earning 64 points. The teams had met once previously in the playoffs with CSKA Moscow winning the second round series, 4–1, in 2016. CSKA Moscow won three out of the four games to be held between the teams during the 2019–20 season, with Torpedo's lone success coming in an overtime game.

(2) SKA Saint Petersburg vs. (7) Vityaz Podolsk
SKA Saint Petersburg finished second in the Western Conference earning 93 points, winning their fourth consecutive Bobrov Division title. Their opponents Vityaz Podolsk finished as the Western Conference's seventh seed, earning 65 points. The teams had met once previously in the playoffs with SKA Saint Petersburg sweeping the first round series in 2017 – having finished as the number 2 and 7 seeds respectively in the 2016–17 season. In their two meetings during the 2019–20 season, SKA Saint Petersburg recorded an overtime victory and Vityaz Podolsk won the other game 4–2.

(3) Jokerit vs. (6) Lokomotiv Yaroslavl
Jokerit finished third in the Western Conference earning 84 points. Their opponents Lokomotiv Yaroslavl finished as the Western Conference's sixth seed, earning 73 points. This was the first playoff meeting between the two teams; the teams played each other six times during the 2019–20 season, with Lokomotiv Yaroslavl winning four of the games.

(4) Dynamo Moscow vs. (5) Spartak Moscow
Dynamo Moscow finished fourth in the Western Conference earning 82 points. Their cross-city opponents and Bobrov Division rivals Spartak Moscow finished as the Western Conference's fifth seed, earning 77 points. The teams had met once previously in the playoffs with Spartak Moscow winning their first round series in 2010. Dynamo Moscow won all four games to be held between the teams during the 2019–20 season.

Player statistics

Scoring leaders

The following players led the league in points, at the cancellation of the season on 25 March 2020. If two or more skaters are tied (i.e. same number of points, goals and played games), all of the tied skaters are shown.

Leading goaltenders
The following goaltenders led the league in goals against average, at the cancellation of the season on 25 March 2020.

References

External links

2019–20 KHL season
Gagarin Cup
Gagarin Cup playoffs